Bayan-Ölgii ("Rich region") is the westernmost of the 21 aimags (provinces) of Mongolia. The country's only Muslim and Kazakh-majority aimag, it was established in August 1940. Its capital is Ölgii.

Geography 
The aimag is located in the extreme west of the country, and shares borders with both Russia and China. The border between the two neighbouring countries is very short here, though, and ends after about 40 km at the eastern end of Kazakhstan. Within Mongolia, the neighbouring aimags are Uvs in the north east and Khovd in the south east.

Bayan-Ölgii is the highest Mongolian aimag. For the most part it is located in the Mongolian Altay, at the transition point to the Russian Altay. About 10% of the territory is covered by forests, consisting primarily of Siberian Larch.

The Nairamdal Peak (also Friendship Peak, Chinese: Youyi Feng) of the Altai Tavan Bogd (five saints mountain) massif mountain marks the corner between the three neighbouring countries. About 2.5 km further south on the Mongolian-Chinese border, the Khüiten Peak is the highest point of Mongolia at a height of 4,374 m. The massif includes several glaciers, such as the 19 km Potanin Glacier, and is only accessible to experienced climbers with local guidance.

The Khovd River (the longest in the western Mongolian Great Lakes Depression) has its origin in this aimag. It is fed by the three lakes Khoton, Khurgan, and Dayan, and in turn feeds the lake Khar-Us in the Khovd Aimag. The Tolbo Lake is a large saline lake about 50 km south of the aimag capital. It features clear and cold water on an elevation of 2,080 m.

Population 
Most inhabitants of Bayan-Ölgii are Kazakhs (93%). The rest of the population is composed of Uriankhai, Dörvöd, Khalkha, Tsengel Tuvans, and Khoshuud. A significant portion of the population speaks Kazakh as their mother tongue and the Mongolian language only as a second language, if at all.

After democratization, many inhabitants moved to their historical homeland, Kazakhstan, assuming they would find a better future there. The result was a noticeable loss of population in 1991-1993, when approx. 80 thousands were repatriated to Kazakhstan. A noticeable number of former immigrants have been returning, so that the population has risen again.

Culture 

The culture of the Kazakh majority is strongly influenced by Islamic traditions. The mosque of Ölgii also houses the Islamic Center of Mongolia. It is placed at an unusual angle within the fabric of the city, because the building was oriented exactly towards Mecca. There is also a madrasah (Islamic school) at the same place.

The aimag is famous for the traditional practice of hunting with trained eagles. The captive eagles work in a similar way as hunting falcons do. While eagles are used for hunting in other parts of the world, particularly Kazakhstan and Kyrgyzstan, the practice is most common in Bayan-Ölgii, where an estimated 80 percent of the world's eagle hunters live. The annual Golden Eagle Festival is held in Ölgii every October to display the skill of eagle hunters, with about 70 hunters participating per year.

Traffic 
The Ölgii Airport (ULG/ZMUL) has one runway, unpaved until 2011. It offers regular flights to Ulaanbaatar and irregular flights to Ulaangom and Mörön in Mongolia and Almaty in Kazakhstan.

A road connecting to Russia starts in Tsagaannuur.

The border with China is open only for a short time in the summer.

National parks 
The Altai Tavan Bogd National Park covers 6,362 km² and is located south of the highest mountain of Mongolia. It includes the lakes Khoton, Khurgan, and Dayan. The protected area offers a home for many species of alpine animal, such as the Argali sheep, Ibex, Red deer, Beech marten, Moose, Snow cock, and Golden eagle.

The Khökh Serkhiin Nuruu Protected Area (659 km²) and the Siilkhemiin Nuruu National Park (1,428 km²) are of similar character.

The Develiin Aral Natural Reserve (103 km²) is established around Develiin Island at the confluence of the rivers Lsan Khooloi and Khovd. Since 2000 it has provided protection for various birds and animals including pheasants, boars, and beavers.

The Tsambagarav Uul National Park includes 1,115 km² of land around the glaciers near the Khovd aimag and protects the snow leopards living there, among others.

Administrative subdivisions 

* - Tsagaannuur including

Governors 

First secretaries
 Şımşırulı Noğay  (1940-1942)
 Düzelbayulı Jeñishan  (1942)
 Ş. Vançinhüü arslan  (1943)
 Mälikulı Qaşqınbay  (1943-1952)
 Muhamädïulı Qurmanhan  (1952-1953)
 Juwanğanulı Rım  (1953-1954)
 Mälikulı Qaşqınbay  (1954-1957)
 Qamatjanulı Musahan  (1958-1962)
 B. Dulamragçaa  (1962-1966)
 B. Dejid  (1966-1970)
 Ya Jigjid  (1970-1976)
 L. Hürlee  (1976-1980)
 Bayatazaulı Qurmetbek  (1980-199)

Chairmen of executive committee
 Bäjiulı Qabï  (1940-1942)
 A. Begzjav  (1942-1943)
 Düzelbayulı Jeñizhan  (1943-1950)
 Muhamädïulı Qurmanhan  (1950-1952)
 Ç. Şagdar  (1952-1953)
 Muhamädïulı Qurmanhan  (1954-1955)
 Şäbiulı Qabdıl  (1955-1958)
 Juwanğanulı Rım  (1959-1970)
 Asqanbayulı Saray  (1970-1978)
 Qusbekulı Qızırhan  (1978-1989)
 T. Davaajav  (1989-1990)

After 1991 
 Küntuwğanulı Mïzamhan  (1990-1996)
 Qadırulı Meyram  (1996-2000)
 Qabdısilämulı Bädelhan  (2000-2004)
 Omarulı Ğabsattar  (2004-2007) (
 Säkeyulı Qabıl (2007-2012)
 Quzkeyulı Därmen  (2012-2016)
 Ayıpulı Ğılımhan  (2016-2020) (

References

Further reading 
 Soma, Takuya & Battulga, Sukhee. 2014. 'Altai Kazakh Falconry as Heritage Tourism: “The Golden Eagle Festival” of Western Mongolia', "The International Journal of Intangible Heritage vol. 9", edited by Alissandra Cummins, pp. 135–148. Seoul: The National Folk Museum of Korea. 　
 Soma, Takuya. 2014. 'Current Situation and Issues of Transhumant Animal Herding in Sagsai County, Bayan Ulgii Province, Western Mongolia', E-journal GEO 9(1): pp. 102–119. 
 Soma, Takuya. 2015. Human and Raptor Interactions in the Context of a Nomadic Society: Anthropological and Ethno-Ornithological Studies of Altaic Kazakh Falconry and its Cultural Sustainability in Western Mongolia. University of Kassel Press, Kassel (Germany) . 
 相馬拓也 2014 「モンゴル西部バヤン・ウルギー県サグサイ村における移動牧畜の現状と課題」『E-Journal GEO vol. 9 (no. 1) 』: pp. 102–189.

External links
Bayan-Olgii Tourism Website
Bayan-Ulgii blog

 
Provinces of Mongolia
States and territories established in 1940
1940 establishments in Mongolia